Hump Butte is a summit in South Dakota, in the United States.

Hump Butte  was so named on account of its outline being in the shape of buffalo's hump.

References

Landforms of Corson County, South Dakota
Mountains of South Dakota